The Royal Parchment Scroll of Black Supremacy is a text from Jamaica, written during the 1920s by a proto-Rastafari preacher, Fitz Balintine Pettersburg. The Royal Parchment Scroll is today recognized as one of the root documents of Rastafari thought, along with The Holy Piby and Leonard P. Howell's The Promise Key, which itself made considerable use of content from Pettersburg's work.

See also
 Black supremacy

References

Further reading
The Royal Parchment Scroll of Black Supremacy by Rev. Fitz Balintine Pettersburgh, Frontline Distribution International Inc. (2003),

External links
complete etext at sacred-texts.com

Rastafarian texts
Black supremacy
1920s documents